Fronto of Emesa was a famous Greek rhetorician and uncle of Cassius Longinus.  Fronto taught rhetoric in Athens. He was born in Emesa. He died in Athens, aged about 60.

References

Bibliography

3rd-century Romans
3rd-century Greek people
3rd-century philosophers
3rd-century writers
Ancient Greek rhetoricians
Roman-era Greeks
Ancient Roman philosophers
Roman-era philosophers in Athens
People from Homs